Greg Phillip Jones (born May 22, 1974) is a former American football linebacker in the National Football League for the Washington Redskins, the Chicago Bears, the Arizona Cardinals, and the Houston Texans.  He played college football at the University of Colorado and was drafted in the second round of the 1997 NFL Draft.

External links
NFL.com player page

1974 births
Living people
Players of American football from Denver
American football linebackers
Colorado Buffaloes football players
Washington Redskins players
Chicago Bears players
Arizona Cardinals players
Houston Texans players